Doak is an unincorporated community in Doddridge County, West Virginia, United States, along Flint Run.

References 

Unincorporated communities in West Virginia
Unincorporated communities in Doddridge County, West Virginia